Alexander Mackay (11 May 1833 – 18 November 1909) was a New Zealand farmer, explorer, linguist, magistrate and land court judge. He was born in Edinburgh, Midlothian, Scotland on 11 May 1833.  James Mackay Sr was his uncle and  James Mackay Jr was his cousin. He married Hannah Sarah Gibbs at Collingwood, a daughter of William Gibbs.

Mackay died at Feilding on 18 November 1909, and was buried at Feilding Cemetery.

References

1833 births
1909 deaths
New Zealand farmers
Linguists from New Zealand
District Court of New Zealand judges
Civil servants from Edinburgh
Scottish emigrants to New Zealand
Māori Land Court judges
Burials at Feilding Cemetery
Colony of New Zealand judges